Potamilus ohiensis, the pink papershell, is a species of freshwater mussel, an aquatic bivalve mollusk in the family Unionidae. It is also known as the papershell or fragile heelsplitter, and is similar to the Leptodea fragilis and Potamilus alatus species.

Description
The pink papershell has a thin, compressed, elongate shell, with rounded anterior and posterior ends. The surface is shiny, and brown or olive green in color. The nacre is pink or purple. They generally live in large rivers, with mud, sand or silt bottoms. Fish known as the freshwater drum and white crappie act as hosts for the glochidia larvae of P. ohiensis.

References

ohiensis
Bivalves described in 1820
Taxa named by Constantine Samuel Rafinesque